Mentorship Academy of Digital Arts or Mentorship Academy, located in Baton Rouge, Louisiana, is a high school in the East Baton Rouge Parish.

History 
Mentorship Academy opened in 2011 after the East Baton Rouge Parish School Board approved its charter in 2010. In March 2017, the school's charter was renewed through 2023.

Location 
Mentorship Academy is located in downtown Baton Rouge, in a six-story building that once housed a bank.

Athletics
Mentorship Academy of Digital Arts athletics competes in the LHSAA.

References 

Schools in Baton Rouge, Louisiana